Below is list of Slovene exonyms and endonyms for places outside of Slovenia:

Albania (Albanija)

Durrës Drač
Shkodër Skader
Tiranë Tirana

Austria (Avstrija)

Bad Radkersburg Radgona
Bruck an der Mur Most na Muri
Eisenstadt Železno
Graz Gradec
Innsbruck Inomost
Leibnitz Lipnica
Salzburg Solnograd
Sankt Michael Sv. Mihael
Seckau Sekava
Wien Dunaj
Wiener Neustadt Dunajsko Novo mesto

Carinthia (Koroška)

Altfinkenstein Stari Grad
Arnoldstein Podklošter
Bad Bleiberg Plajberk
Bad Eisenkappel Železna Kapla
Bad Vellach Bela
Bleiburg Pliberk
Buchbrunn Bukovje
Buchhalm Podhom
Buchheim Podhum
Diex Djekše
Dolintschach Dolinčiče
Dragositschach Dragožiče
Dreilach Dravlje
Duell Dole
Eberndorf Dobrla vas
Edling Kazaze
Eibiswald Ivnik
Emmersdorf Tmara vas
Faak am See Bače
Feistritz Bistrica
 Feistritz an der Drau Bistrica na Dravi
 Feistritz ob Bleiburg Bistrica pri Pliberku
 Feistritz an der Gail Bistrica na Zilji 
 Feistritz im Rosental Bistrica v Rožu
Feldkirchen in Kärnten Trg
Ferlach Borovlje
Finkenstein am Faaker See Bekštanj
Fresnach Brežnje
Frießnitz Breznica
Frög Breg
Frojach Broje
Fürnitz Brnca
Gablern Lovanke
Gerlitzen Osojščica
Gödersdorf Vodiča vas
Gorintschach Gorinčiče
Goritschach Zagoriče
Gösselsdorf Goselna vas
Greuth Rute
Gurk Krka
Hart Dobrova
Höfling Dvorec
Hohenthurn Straja vas
Homitzberg Homec
Humtschach Homče
Kanin Hodnina
Karnburg Krnski Grad
Kerschdorf im Gailtal Črešnje
Klagenfurt Celovec
Kleinberg Mala gora
Köcking Kokje
Kohldorf Voglje
Kopein Kopanje
Korpitsch Grpiče
Kühnsdorf Sinča vas
Längdorf Velika vas
Latschach Loče
Lavamünd Labot
Ledenitzen Ledince
Leibnitz Lipnica
Lessach Leše
Loibegg Belovče
Ludmannsdorf Bilčovs
Mallenitzen Malence
Maria Elend Podgorje
Maria Gail Marija na Zilji
Maria Saal Gospa Sveta
Maria Wörth Otok
Millstatt Milje, Milštat
Mittlern Metlova
Mökriach Mokrije
Mühlbach Reka
Müllnern Mlinare
Nötsch im Gailtal Čajna
Oberaichwald Zgornje Dobje
Oberburg Zgornij Podgrad
Oberferlach Zgornje Borovlje
Obergoritschach Zgornje Goriče
Ossiach Osoje
Outschena Ovčna
Petschnitzen Pečnica
Pirk Brezje
Pogöriach Pogorje
Pörtschach Poreče
Pribelsdorf Priblja vas
Ratnitz Ratenče
Raun Ravne
Rosegg Rožek
Rosenbach Podrožca
Saak Čače
Sand (Wernberg) Pešče
Sankt Jakob Šentjakob
Sankt Job Šentjob
Sankt Johann (Rosegg) Ščedem
Sankt Lamprecht Semislavče
Sankt Martin (Rosegg) Šmartin
Sankt Marxen Šmarkež
Sankt Oswald Šentožbolt
Sankt Paul im Lavatal Šentpal
Sankt Peter Šentpeter
Sankt Veit am Glan Šent Vid na Glini
Schlatten Svatne
Seebach Jezernica
Sigmontitsch Zmotiče
Srajach Sreje
Stobitzen Stopca
Susalitsch Žužalče
Tainach Tinje
Tallach Tale
Techanting Teharče
Tösching Tešinja
Trabenig Trabenče
Treffen Trebinje
Umberg Umbar
Unteraichwald Spodnje Dobje
Unterbergen Podgora
Unterferlach Spodnje Borovlje
Untergoritschach Spodnje Goriče
Untergreuth Spodnje Rute
Unterloibl Podljubelj
Velden Vrba
Villach Beljak
Völkermarkt Velikovec
Wasserhofen Žirovnica
Wernberg Vernberk
Winkl Kot
Wolfsberg Volšperk

Belgium (Belgija)

Brussel-Bruxelles Bruselj

Croatia (Hrvaška)

Karlovac Karlovec
Osijek Osek
Pula Pulj
Rijeka Reka
Sisak Sisek
Zadar Zader

Cyprus (Ciper)

Lefkosia Nikozija

Czech Republic (Češka)

Praha Praga

Denmark (Danska)

København Kopenhagen

France (Francija)

Nice Nica
Paris Pariz

Germany (Nemčija)

Aachen Cahe (obsolete)
Bautzen Budišin
Chemnitz Kamnica
Köln Kolmorajn (obsolete)
Dresden Draždani
Freising Brižinje
München Monakovo
Regensburg Rezno (obsolete)

Greece (Grčija)

Athina Atene
Kerkyra Krf
Korinthos Korint
Kriti Kreta
Peiraias Pirej
Rhodhos Rodos
Thessaloniki Solun

Hungary (Madžarska)

Alsószölnök Dolnji Senik
Budapest Budimpešta
Felsőszölnök Gornji Senik
Pécs Pečuh
Székesfehérvár Stolni Beligrad
Szentgotthárd Monošter
Szombathely Sombotelj

Italy (Italija)

Ancona Jakin
Bolzano Bocen
Florence (Firenze) Firence
Milan (Milano) Milan
Brixen Briksen
Naples (Napoli) Neapelj
Pisa Piza
Rome (Roma) Rim
Syracuse (Siracuse) Sirakuze
Turin (Torino) Turin
Venice (Venezia) Benetke

Friuli Venezia Giulia (Furlanija-Julijska krajina)

Aquileia Oglej
Attimis Ahten
Chiusaforte Kluže
Cividale del Friuli Čedad
Cormons Krmín
Corno di Rosazzo Rožac
Doberdò del Lago Doberdob
Dogna Dunja
Drenchia Dreka
Duino Devin
Aurisina Nabrežina
Aurisina S. Croce Nabrežina Križ
Cervignano Červinjan
Dolegna del Collio Dolenje
Faedis Fojda
Fogliano Redipuglia Fojana Rodopolje
Gemona del Friuli Humin
Gorizia Gorica
Grado Gradež
Gradisca Gradišče ob Soči
Grimacco Grmek
Lusevera Brdo
Monfalcone Tržič
Malborghetto Valbruna Naborjet – Ovčja vas
Moggio Udinese Mužac
Monrupino Repentabor
Montenars Gorjani
Muggia Milje
Nimis Neme
Pontebba Tablja
Prepotto Praprotno
Pulfero Podbonesec
Resia Rezija
Resiutta Na Bili
Ronchi dei Legionari Ronke
Sagrado Zagraj
San Dorligo della Valle Dolina
San Floriano del Collio Števerjan
San Giovanni di Duino Štivan
San Leonardo Podutana
San Pelagio Šempolaj
San Pietro al Natisone Špeter Slovenov
Santa Croce di Trieste Križ
Savogna di Cividale Sovodnje
Savogna d'Isonzo Sovodnje ob Soči
Sgonico Zgonik
Sistiana Sesljan
Staranzano Štarancan
Taipana Tipana
Tarcento Čenta
Tarvisio Trbiž
Torreano Tavorjana
Turriaco Turjak
Triest Trst
Udine Videm
Venzone Pušja vas
Villa Opicina Opčine

Lithuania (Litva)

Kaunas Kovno
Vilnius Vilna

Luxembourg (Luksemburg)

Luxembourg Luksemburg

Moldova (Moldavija)

Chişinău Kišinjev

Poland (Poljska)

Bydgoszcz Bidgošč
Bytom Bitom
Częstochowa Čenstohova
Gliwice Glivice
Katowice Katovice
Kraków Krakov
Łódź Lodž
Poznań Poznanj
Szczecin Štetin
Warsaw Varšava
Wroclaw Vroclav

Portugal (Portugalska)

Lisboa Lizbona

Romania (Romunija)

București Bukarešta
Timișoara Temišvar

Serbia (Srbija) 

Belgrade Belgrad

Spain (Španija)

Córdoba Kordova (obsolete)
Ibiza Ibica (obsolete)
Mallorca Malorka (obsolete)
Menorca Menorka (obsolete)
Salamanca Salamanka (Obsolete)
Sevilla Sevilja
Valencia Valencija
Zaragoza Saragosa

Switzerland (Švica) 

Genève Ženeva
Lausanne Lozana (obsolete)
Luzern Lucern

Turkey (Turčija)

Alanya Alanija
Antalya Antalija
Edirne Odrin
İstanbul Carigrad
Izmir Smirna

Ukraine (Ukrajina)

Kyyiv Kijev
L'viv Lvov
Kharkiv Harkov

References

See also

List of European exonyms
Official list of Slovene exonyms (pdf-format)

Slovene language
Lists of exonyms